Thokampen or Tokampen is a mountain in Sel Municipality in Innlandet county, Norway.

See also
List of mountains of Norway by height

References

Sel
Mountains of Innlandet